
Year 442 BC was a year of the pre-Julian Roman calendar. At the time, it was known as the Year of the Consulship of Vibulanus and Helva (or, less frequently, year 312 Ab urbe condita). The denomination 442 BC for this year has been used since the early medieval period, when the Anno Domini calendar era became the prevalent method in Europe for naming years.

Events 
 By place 
 Greece 
 As a result of his failure to effectively challenge Pericles, the Athenian citizens ostracise Thucydides for 10 years and Pericles is once again unchallenged in Athenian politics.

 By topic 
 Literature 
 Sophocles writes Antigone.

Births

Deaths 
 Zhou zhen ding wang, King of the Zhou Dynasty of China

References